The Original Pantry Cafe is a coffee shop and restaurant in Los Angeles, California. Located at the corner of 9th and Figueroa in Downtown L.A.'s South Park district, The Pantry (as it is known by locals) claims to never have closed or been without a customer since it opened including when it changed locations in 1950 to make room for a freeway off-ramp; it served lunch in the original location and served dinner at the new location the same day. This claim is also attributed to the fact that Dewey Logan never refused a customer even if the customer was short on money. It was however, closed briefly at the order of health inspectors on November 26, 1997, and reopened the next day. That tradition has ended however due to the COVID-19 pandemic in California, and the restaurant is currently open from 7 am to either 3 or 5 pm, depending on the day. The restaurant is currently owned by former Los Angeles mayor Richard Riordan and has served many celebrities and politicians.

History
When it was opened in 1924 at its original location at 9th Street and Francisco Street, the restaurant consisted of one room, a 15-stool counter, a small grill, a hot plate and sink. In 1950, The Pantry moved to its current location at 9th and Figueroa, and has since been designated as a Los Angeles Historic-Cultural Monument No. 255, and has been ranked as the most famous restaurant in Los Angeles.

The restaurant is known for serving coleslaw to all patrons in the evening hours, even if they ultimately decide to order  breakfast. It claims to serve 90 tons of bread (or 461 loaves per day) and 10.5 tons (20,000-tree harvest) of coffee per year.

After 87 years, the restaurant's tradition of serving free coffee ended in 2011.

Part of the building on Figueroa Street became Riordan's Tavern, also owned by the former mayor.

For the celebration of the 90th anniversary of the restaurant in 2014, some people submitted their stories around The Original Pantry Cafe. This was the text ("A Pancake Tradition") of the winner, Devin Kelley. A sign can be found in the entrance of the coffee shop:
It's Sunday, 10:30. Brunch-time. We're standing in line outside the Original Pantry. The summer breeze ripples my t-shirt. I grin at my grandma. She's standing, not noticing me, arms crossed, looking ahead at the front door. I count the heads in front of us again. Now we're in ninth place. The couple behind us shuffles their shoes, catching up with us, as the line shifts forward another few feet. The line is long but welcoming. Everyone wavers in it, shifting, looking behind, forward again, and heads bobbing and peering over others towards the front. My grandma looks at me, a paper menu clutched between soft fists, and forces a smile. She's been going here since she was nine years old. Always, every Sunday, her mother and father would bring her to the pantry after mass, allowing her to order whatever she desired. Scanning the long menu, between the classic Sour Dough French Toast, and the mouth-watering Bacon and Cheese Omelet, she would wrinkle her brow and pretend to consider ordering something different. But she never did. It was always the pancakes and a large orange juice. Her parents would laugh at her seriousness. "Let me guess," her mother would say. "The Pancakes?" My grandma taught me this not-so-secret combination when I was nine. I too ordered the pancakes every time. I too dreamed of the pillowy cakes drenched in maple syrup and butter. I too washed it down with a tall glass of OJ. And I too pretended, though I never meant it, to consider the long list of options on the menu. We had a simple tradition at the Pantry. The line moves again. I count the heads. We're three feet away from the entrance and I can already smell the buttery bread and bacon. My grandma puts her arm around my shoulder and winks at me, as she drops her menu on the ground. I bend to pick it up, but as I do, I notice two tall, large men, sneak in front of us. "Excuse me" my grandma says, "the line starts back there." She points down St. James Blvd., down a long line of excited people fidgeting. Somewhere in line a man is playing soft rock on his phone. It's "Take it Easy" by the Eagles. The two big men, one with sunglasses and a muscle shirt, and the other with torn jeans, ignore her call to arms. To my amazement, she pokes one of them on the back. "What do you want old lady?" the man exclaims as he turns around. "Excuse me, my grandson and I have been waiting in line for pancakes. That's all." The man in torn jeans looks at me and then at the old lady who had just challenged him. His eyes droop and he grabs his friend by the bicep. "My grandma use to take me here when I was young" he says. "Come on" he says to his friend. "The line starts back there." My grandma takes me by the hand, nods her head, and smiles wide.

Lore
The wait staff, and even the cook, were known for wearing impeccably starched white dress shirts with black bow ties.

It was said that The Pantry hired its staff from among men recently released from jail or prison, providing them with an occupation as a way of rehabilitating them into society. This however, cannot be substantiated.

For many years, a gentleman who could have passed as the twin brother of actor Humphrey Bogart worked at The Pantry as a waiter, and was known as "Bogie" by regulars.

In popular culture
The cafe is regularly mentioned or visited by characters in Michael Connelly's series of mystery novels featuring LAPD detective Harry Bosch, including The Black Echo and The Last Coyote.

The restaurant is featured in a scene in Judd Apatow's 2007 comedy Knocked Up, in which Seth Rogen's character informs his father (Harold Ramis) of his girlfriend's pregnancy.

References

1924 establishments in California
Buildings and structures in Downtown Los Angeles
Los Angeles Historic-Cultural Monuments
Restaurants established in 1924
Restaurants in Los Angeles